Johnny Mølby (born 4 February 1969) is a Danish football manager and former professional footballer. He is currently the assistant coach of AGF.

He played 16 matches for the Denmark national football team, and was a part of the team which won the Euro 1992, even though he did not play a single match at the tournament. He is a cousin of former Liverpool F.C. player Jan Mølby.

Through his career he represented a number of clubs, including Danish teams Vejle BK, Aalborg BK and AGF Aarhus, FC Nantes in France and Borussia Mönchengladbach in Germany. Following his retirement, Mølby became manager of Kolding FC after he had completed the Danish FA's Elite Coach education and obtained a DBU and UEFA A-License.

He was named the Danish U21-talent of the year in 1987.

Honours

International 
UEFA European Football Championship: 1992

References

External links
 Danish national team profile 
 Danish Superliga profile 

1969 births
Living people
People from Kolding
Danish men's footballers
Denmark international footballers
Denmark under-21 international footballers
Denmark youth international footballers
Vejle Boldklub players
AaB Fodbold players
Aarhus Gymnastikforening players
K.V. Mechelen players
FC Nantes players
Borussia Mönchengladbach players
Danish Superliga players
Belgian Pro League players
Bundesliga players
Ligue 1 players
Danish expatriate men's footballers
Expatriate footballers in Belgium
Expatriate footballers in Germany
Expatriate footballers in France
Danish football managers
UEFA Euro 1992 players
UEFA European Championship-winning players
Association football midfielders
Danish Superliga managers
AC Horsens managers
Viborg FF managers
Vendsyssel FF managers
Danish 1st Division managers
Sportspeople from the Region of Southern Denmark